Emily Dreissigacker (born November 29, 1988) is a former biathlete from Vermont.

Life and career 
She competed for the United States at the 2018 Winter Olympics. As a teenager, Dreissigacker competed in cross-country skiing before taking up competitive rowing, going on to become a two-time NCAA All-American whilst a student at Dartmouth College, where she graduated with a degree in economics in 2011. Her switch to biathlon came about in 2014, when she injured her finger in an accident, leaving her unable to row for three months. As a result, she took up cross-country skiing again as cross-training. She retired from biathlon after the 2019/20 season.

Her father, Dick Dreissigacker, is an Olympic rower; her mother, Judy Geer, is a three time Olympian in rowing; and her maternal aunt, Charlotte Geer, is a two time Olympian and 1984 Olympic silver medalist  in single sculling. She is the sister of fellow Olympic biathlete Hannah Dreissigacker.

Biathlon results

Olympic Games

World Championships

References

External links
 Dartmouth Big Green bio

1988 births
Living people
Sportspeople from Vermont
American female biathletes
Biathletes at the 2018 Winter Olympics
Olympic biathletes of the United States
Dartmouth Big Green women's rowers
Dartmouth College alumni
People from Morristown, Vermont